The Chaude River (in French: rivière Chaude) flows successively in the municipalities of Mont-Carmel, Saint-Gabriel-Lalemant and Saint-Onésime-d'Ixworth, in the Kamouraska Regional County Municipality, in the administrative region of Bas-Saint-Laurent, in Quebec, in Canada.

The Chaude River is a tributary of the east bank of the Grande River, which flows on the eastern bank of the Ouelle River which in turn flows on the south bank of the St. Lawrence River.

Geography 
The Chaude River has its source in Chaudière Lake which is located in the municipality of Mont-Carmel in the heart of the Notre Dame Mountains.

  towards the south in Mont-Carmel, until the confluence of a stream (coming from the south) which drains the locality “La Plaine Molle”;
  north-west, up to the confluence of the waterway designated "Tête de la Rivière Chaude" which has its source at Lac des Cinq Milles and flows ;
  northeasterly, to the Canadian National railway;
  westward, up to the limit between Saint-Gabriel-Lalemant;
  westward in Saint-Gabriel-Lalemant, to the limit of Saint-Onésime-d'Ixworth;
  westward, up to its confluence.

The confluence of the river is located in the municipality of Saint-Onésime-d'Ixworth.

Toponymy 
The toponym Chaude River was formalized on December 2, 1975, by the Commission de toponymie du Québec.

See also

 List of rivers of Quebec

References 

Rivers of Bas-Saint-Laurent